Selima Rahman is a Bangladesh Nationalist Party (BNP) politician. She served as a State Minister at the Ministry of Cultural Affairs of the Government of Bangladesh during 2001–2006.

Background
Rahman is the daughter of justice Abdul Jabbar Khan, a former speaker of the Pakistan National Assembly. Her siblings include journalist and columnist Sadek Khan, poet Abu Zafar Obaidullah, journalist and government minister A.Z.M. Enayetullah Khan, government minister Rashed Khan Menon, architect Sultan M. Khan, photographer Allen Khan and the publisher of New Age, Shahidullah Khan Badal.

Career
Rahman served as the  joint secretary general and vice-chairman of BNP.

Rahman was arrested several times during her political career — in April 2012 under section 54 of the Criminal Procedure Code, in December 2013, in January 2014 for the Ramna Police Station arson case, in August 2015 for assaulting police and in September 2016 for an arson attack on a bus.

References

Living people
Bangladesh Nationalist Party politicians
Women government ministers of Bangladesh
8th Jatiya Sangsad members
Year of birth missing (living people)
Place of birth missing (living people)
State Ministers of Cultural Affairs (Bangladesh)
Women members of the Jatiya Sangsad
20th-century Bangladeshi women politicians
21st-century Bangladeshi women politicians